Daring Daughters is a 1933 American pre-Code melodrama film, directed by Christy Cabanne. It stars Marian Marsh, Kenneth Thomson, and Joan Marsh, and was released on March 25, 1933.

Cast list
 Marian Marsh as Terry Cummings
 Kenneth Thomson as Alan Preston
 Joan Marsh as Betty Cummings
 Bert Roach as Joby Johnson
 Allen Vincent as Edgar Barrett
 Lita Chevret as Gwen Moore
 Richard Tucker as Lawton
 Arthur Hoyt as Hubbard
 Florence Roberts as Grandmother
 Bryant Washburn Jr. as Roy Andrews

References

External links 
 
 
 

Melodrama films
Films directed by Christy Cabanne
1933 drama films
1933 films
American black-and-white films
American drama films
Films with screenplays by F. Hugh Herbert
1930s American films